Stokkøy Bridge is a concrete cantilever bridge that crosses the Stokksundet strait between the mainland and the island of Stokkøya in the municipality of Åfjord in Trøndelag county, Norway.  The bridge starts near the village of Revsnes on the mainland and goes north to the island of Stokkøya near the village of Harsvika.

The  bridge was opened in December 2000.

See also
List of bridges in Norway
List of bridges in Norway by length
List of bridges
List of longest bridges in the world

References

External links
Construction of Stokkøy Bridge
Construction of the bridge
A picture of Stokkøy Bridge

Åfjord
Bridges completed in 2000
Road bridges in Trøndelag
2000 establishments in Norway